The Deluxtone Rockets is the eponymous debut album from Michigan band The Deluxtone Rockets. Musically the album has been described as swing music filtered through punk, sometimes achieving a middle ground between surf and 1950s rockabilly. Lyrically the album covers "familiar territory" – similar to that of Horton Heat but with a moralistic slant.

Track listing 
 "Tijuana Jumping Bean"  – 3:26
 "Green-Eyed Cat"  – 3:22
 "Long Road Home"  – 3:31
 "Be Bop A Go Go"  – 2:30
 "You Get Burned"  – 4:05
 "Rev It Up"  – 3:37
 "Hi-Fi Daddy"  – 4:10
 "Johnny In The Mirror"  – 4:15
 "God's Cadillac"  – 2:28
 "Rumble With The Devil"  – 3:58
 "Kitten"  – 4:15

References 

The Deluxtone Rockets albums
1999 debut albums
Tooth & Nail Records albums